Eagle Creek Golf Club is an eighteen-hole golf course located in near the Lake Nona region of Orlando, Florida.  The course has a par of 73 and measures , containing five par-5 holes and over ninety bunkers. The course is public and includes a  clubhouse with a pro shop as well as a 120-seat restaurant.

History 
Eagle Creek is an Emerson International development designed by Ron Garl and Howard Swan. The course opened for business in May 2004.  Eagle Creek Golf Club was the first golf course in Florida to use Mini Verde Grass on its greens, and the first course in central Florida to offer PrecedentGolf Cars made by Club Car. In October 2004, Eagle Creek became home to Graves Golf Academy.

In November 2004, Travel + Leisure Golf magazine named Eagle Creek as one of the best courses to open in Florida since 2000. The course received a rating of 4.5 stars (out of 5) in Golf Digest's Places to Play program in June 2006; this was the highest rating ever awarded by Golf Digest to a Florida golf course.

Eagle Creek hosted a PGA Pro-Pro Series tournament in January 2005 during the week of the 52nd PGA Merchandise Show. In April 2006, Eagle Creek was named host site for the 2006 Florida Open.

References 

 

Golf clubs and courses in Greater Orlando
Sports venues in Orlando, Florida
2004 establishments in Florida